Gill is a ghost town in Harding County, in the U.S. state of South Dakota.

History
A post office called Gill was established in 1912, and remained in operation until 1945. The town derived its name from early postmaster Carl M. Gilberg.

References

Ghost towns in South Dakota
Geography of Harding County, South Dakota